The Fox Theatre, a former movie palace, is a performing arts center located at 527 N. Grand Blvd. in St. Louis, Missouri, United States. Also known as "The Fabulous Fox", it is situated in the arts district of the Grand Center area in Midtown St. Louis, one block north of Saint Louis University. It opened in 1929 and was completely restored in 1982.

History

The Fox was built in 1929 by movie pioneer William Fox as a showcase for the films of the Fox Film Corporation and elaborate stage shows. It was one of a group of five spectacular Fox Theatres built by Fox in the late 1920s. (The others were the Fox Theatres in Brooklyn, Atlanta, Detroit, and San Francisco.)

When the theater opened on January 31, 1929, it was reportedly the second-largest theater in the United States, with 5,060 seats. It was one of St. Louis's leading movie theaters through the 1960s and has survived to become a versatile performing arts venue.

The Fox was designed by an architect specializing in theaters, C. Howard Crane, in an eclectic blend of Asian decorative motifs sometimes called Siamese Byzantine. The interior is the architectural twin of another Fox Theatre built in Detroit in 1928. Reporters in 1929 described the Fox Theatres in St. Louis and Detroit as "awe-inspiringly fashioned after Hindoo (sic) Mosques of Old India, bewildering in their richness and dazzling in their appointments ... striking a note that reverberates around the architectural and theatrical worlds." William Fox nicknamed the style the "Eve Leo Style" in tribute to his wife, who decorated the interior with furnishings, paintings and sculpture she had bought on her trips overseas.

The Fox Theatre closed in March 1978 and was purchased by Fox Associates in 1981. The theater was restored at a price of at least $3 million and in comparison, the Fox cost $6 million to build in 1929. It reopened in September 1982 with the Broadway musical Barnum. Fox Theatricals is also the operator of the Briar Street Theater in Chicago.

The Fox seats 4,192 theatergoers plus 234 in the private Fox Club.

In September 2007, the venue celebrated the 25th anniversary of its re-opening with a concert featuring Brian Stokes Mitchell and Linda Eder and a day of the theater showing movies in a throwback to its beginnings.

Notable events
The facade of the Fox briefly appears in the 1981 John Carpenter film Escape from New York as an abandoned Broadway theatre.  Kurt Russell's character, Snake, is seen approaching the theatre from the east, hearing music within, then entering. (A close look at the graffiti on the building clearly reveals the words: FOX THEATRE.)  However, the shots immediately following are the interior of the Wiltern Theatre in Los Angeles.

The Theatre hosted a 60th birthday concert for St. Louis–born, early rock and roll pioneer, Chuck Berry in 1986. Keith Richards, of The Rolling Stones, was the project's musical director and backing band leader. Taylor Hackford incorporated the concert into a documentary film about Berry and released the film as Hail! Hail! Rock 'n' Roll, as a feature. In the film, Berry mentions that, as a child growing up in St. Louis, he was denied entrance to the Fox to watch a film because he was black.

Filmed and recorded while on tour promoting his 1990 album  The Wild Places, Dan Fogelberg's June 25, 1991 performance at the Fox was later released in October of the same year as the concert film and live album Dan Fogelberg Live: Greetings from the West.

The theatre played host to the politically motivated Vote for Change Tour on October 6, 2004, featuring a performance by Pearl Jam.

The Fox was the final stop of the Third National Tour of Les Misérables, with the final show taking place on July 23, 2006. The tour ran for 17 years, totaling 7,061 performances.

The hit NBC show America's Got Talent came to the Fox Theatre March 8 to March 10, 2012 to film 5 tapings where over 75 contenders stepped in front of the three celebrity judges, Howie Mandel, Sharon Osbourne, Howard Stern, and host Nick Cannon. "We've been in three cities so far, and St. Louis has had the best talent," Stern said in an interview between Friday’s tapings. The judges said they were equally impressed by the lively audiences at the Fox, which Mandel said were "super jacked."

Theater organ
The theater's Wurlitzer pipe organ cost $75,000 in 1929. It has four manuals, 36 ranks and 348 stops. Restoration of the organ was undertaken by Marlin Mackley in 1981.

Tom Terry was the theater's resident organist from 1929 to 1935. The organ was not played for the public from 1935 to 1952.
In 1952, Stan Kann was named resident organist. He served as organist at the Fox for 22 years and became something of a legend to theater organ aficionados.

A second Wurlitzer organ was installed in the lobby during the theater's renovation in the 1980s. It replaced the original Möller organ which had been removed. The smaller lobby organ has two manuals and 11 ranks and had been originally installed in the Majestic Theatre in East St. Louis, Illinois in 1930.

See also

References

External links

 Fox Theatre official website
 
KETC Fox Theater Video on the Fox Theater assembled by local PBS station KETC
KETC Fox Theater organ Video on the Fox Theater organ and an organist

Buildings and structures in St. Louis
Commercial buildings completed in 1929
Concert halls in Missouri
Culture of St. Louis
Cinemas and movie theaters in Missouri
Landmarks of St. Louis
Movie palaces
Music venues in St. Louis
Performing arts centers in Missouri
Theatres in Missouri
Tourist attractions in St. Louis
National Register of Historic Places in St. Louis
Theatres on the National Register of Historic Places in Missouri
Midtown St. Louis
Public venues with a theatre organ
1929 establishments in Missouri